A roustabout is a type of worker. The word may also refer to:

Roustabout (film), a 1964 film starring Elvis Presley
Roustabout (album), the soundtrack by Elvis Presley to the film by the same name (see above)
"Roustabout" (Elvis Presley song), a song by Elvis Presley from the above film
"Roust-A-Bout", a song by Lester Flatt and Earl Scruggs from the 1967 album Hear the Whistles Blow – Lester Flatt and Earl Scruggs Sing Songs of Rivers and Rails
"Roustabout", a track on Mark Simpson's folk album Special Agent
"Roustabout", a song by Bow Wow Wow from When the Going Gets Tough, The Tough Get Going
Roustabout, 1933 winner of the Grand Union Hotel Stakes horse race
Mark Roustabout, member of The Force (band)
Roustabout, a character in the Astro City comic book series